Nicomachus was a scribe who headed an Athenian committee, the , tasked with publishing the laws of Draco and Solon after the oligarchic revolution of 411 BC had been suppressed by the democrats. Lysias in a speech denouncing Nicomachus notes that the scribe's father was a public slave, and implies that he was a freedman. His original commission of four months by various pretences extended to six years, throughout which, Lysias claims, he accepted money to interpolate or omit laws at the behest of others, most notably to allow the oligarchs to oversee the trial that ended in Cleophon's death sentence. Lysias notes that his position went unaudited for several years, whereas most magistracies and commissions underwent a review at the end of each prytany.

Isocrates mentions a Nicomachus of Bate, who, in the same decade, served as an arbitrator in a property case arising out of the actions of the Thirty.

Notes

Ancient Greek scribes
5th-century BC Athenians
Year of birth unknown
Year of death unknown